Hiperconectados  (English: Hyperlinked) was a television program covering the digital culture of Argentina, presented by Guillermo "Fierita" Catalano, actress Noelia Marzol and Tomas Balmaceda. It also features the voice of Maitena Aboitiz.

General information
In Hiperconectados the latest digital trends are presented, including new social networks and video games. At the same time, they also have their space figures show, sports, music and their relationship with their favorite devices.

Equipment
Host: Fierita
Co-hostess: Noelia Marzol and Tomás Balmaceda
Locution: Maitena Aboitiz
Scenography: Carlos Golac
Setting: Luis Gonzalez Oliva
Sound: Ruben Peratta
Lighting: Pablo Tassara
Post production: Gaston Carballal
Technical producer: Marcelo Caltabiano
Directors assistant: Daniel Mercatante
Production: Marcelo Mateo, Eleonora Ranni, Carla Quiroga and Gabriel Kameniecki
Address: Grendel Resquin and Angel Knight
Executive producer(s): Cristian Chaparro and Martin Elizagaray
Music: Claudio Bravo

References

Telefe original programming
Television in Argentina
Argentine television shows